Alex Apollonov (born 27 July 1992) is an Australian YouTube personality and comedian, better known for his online presence as I did a thing, and his YouTube channel of the same name. He is also the co-star of Boy Boy which he created with fellow comedian Aleksa Vulović who also stars in his videos. Much of his content involves using his engineering and fabrication skills to design and build a variety of projects, including recreating the Utah monolith in Australia, simulating the Aurora Borealis in his kitchen with a high voltage transformer to parody The Simpsons and making a scaled-up Beyblade that is spun by a chainsaw. Other projects have included building a laser guided drone that drops steel darts and creating a hammer that uses .22 caliber blank rounds to drive nails. Often his videos will contain commentary on politics and global events, including climate change, gun violence, Australia's colonial legacy and the COVID-19 pandemic.

Many of Apollonov's projects have gained widespread media attention in Australia, including his trip to North Korea to get a haircut, his successful attempt to enter Australia's second-largest casino with overt COVID-19 symptoms, and for recreating the Utah monolith in Australia. His content is often uploaded by the comedy group The Chaser, and has collaborated with other YouTubers including Boyinaband, maxmoefoe, William Osman, IDubbbz, and the comedy group Aunty Donna. Many of Apollonov's videos also star fellow comedian Aleksa Vulović, as the two are very close friends and often work on their individual projects with help from one another. Apollonov also has an active twitter following of 101,000 followers.

In May 2022, Apollonov participated in the Creator Clash event set up by fellow YouTuber Ian Carter (iDubbbz) alongside many other YouTube personalities. He fought against Robert James Rallison (TheOdd1sOut) and won.

Boy Boy (2016-present) 
In 2016, Alex Apollonov and fellow comedian Aleksa Vulović founded the YouTube channel Boy Boy. Much of the content centered around myth-busting sensationalist claims in Australian media, while also using comedy to bring light to issues of such as climate change, colonialism, police violence, and racism. One video produced by this channel included Apollonov calling an Australian anti-terrorist hotline and reporting Vulović for wanting to join a violent militaristic organisation with ties to violence in the Middle East, which at the end of the video was revealed to be the Australian military. Due to the low traffic of the Boy Boy channel, Alex Apollonov created a new channel in 2018 titled "I did a thing", although he still uploads videos to Boy Boy on a less frequent basis.

The Haircut (2017) 
The short documentary-style movie titled The Haircut (2017) was the most successful comedic project produced by the Boy Boy channel and would gain widespread coverage from Australian media which would help launch Alex Apollonov's comedy career. In the movie, Alex Apollonov and Aleksa Vulović both travelled to North Korea to investigate dubious claims in Australian media that North Koreans were either forced to cut their hair like Kim Jong-un or that their government orders which hairstyles their citizens are allowed to have. During their investigation, neither Alex nor Aleksa could find any evidence to support the claims of government-mandated hairstyles and came to the conclusion that these stories were most likely fake. "When we started to look into some of those media stories we found out that a lot of them weren't true." Apollonov further described his opinions on Australian/USA relations with the DPRK, saying that “North Korea has tested four [nukes], and that is very scary… but imagine how scary it is for them to think that the US alone has tested 1,032 nukes? … We’ve used ours… against real people.” Vulovic shared Apollonov's opinions, saying that "What the haircut law and all these other ‘amazing’ stories share in common is at the very centre of this media whirlwind, they are based on absolutely nothing."

The Hooligans (2018) 
To investigate news of violence among Russian football hooligans, Alex Apollonov and Aleksa Vulović travelled to Russia together to interview fans of various Russian football clubs and embedded themselves within groups accused of hooligan violence. Apollonov said that his reasoning for creating this short documentary was that "As a film maker I'd never miss the opportunity to film my mate (Aleksa Vulović) getting beaten up overseas."

Covid casino stunt (2020) 
During the COVID-19 pandemic, Alex Apollonov and Aleksa Vulović partnered with The Chaser to create a comedic investigation where they attempted to enter Australia's second-largest casino, The Star (Sydney) while displaying as many symptoms as possible to see whether they would be allowed inside during the pandemic. In one attempt, Aleksa tried entering the casino while dressed in hospital surgical garbs, dragging an IV drip stand on wheels, with a high forehead temperature. Despite telling the casino staff that he had come straight from a nearby hospital, he was allowed to enter the casino where he spent his time using the gaming machines while wearing a white shirt saying "I have covid" in bold black letters. "When I rocked up with my hospital gown and drip, the first thing they asked me was whether I had a Star Casino gold membership card". Alex Apollonov followed Aleksa into the casino with a forehead temperature of 48°C, or 118.4°F) (achieved using heat packs), which the staff detected with a temperature gun and was still allowed entry to the casino. "My head was still really hot after I got inside", said Apollonov. "I must have drunk 3 or 4 of their complimentary water bottles. They're obviously very used to catering for sick customers". When asked about possible legal repercussions over their comedic stunt, Vulović replied: "There's no point suing us, we already lost all our savings on big wheel during our filming breaks".

I did a thing (2018-present) 
In 2018 Alex Apollonov's new channel "I did a thing" would become far more popular than any of his previous comedic projects and would become the channel he is most famous for. Although this channel belongs to Apollonov, most of his content still features and includes Aleksa Vulović, with whom he created the Boy Boy channel. This new channel features Apollonov using his engineering and fabrication skills to complete a variety of home-designed projects. Some of Apollonov's projects investigate political current issues, such as creating a homemade air quality test to investigate the pollution in Sydney and using a compressed air cannon to test less-than-lethal ammunition. In 2020 I did a thing reached one million subscribers, awarding Apollonov the Gold Play Button award.

2020 Monolith project (2020) 
In 2020, a mysterious metal monolith of unknown origin appeared in Utah, dubbed the Utah monolith. As more of these monoliths appeared across the globe in England, Romania and the Netherlands, Apollonov teamed up with Australian comedy group Aunty Donna to create their own metal monolith which they planted in Australia. The monolith was planted outside Melbourne, Australia. Aunty Donna jokingly said that their monolith and the collaboration with 'I did a thing' was to promote their upcoming Netflix show.

Trademark clashes with Jeremy Clarkson (2022) 
In early 2022 Apollonov got involved in a clash with the former host of Top Gear Jeremy Clarkson over the latter's attempt to trademark the phrase "I did a thing".

Curdle Hill Farm Ltd, a company which Jeremy Clarkson' co-directs alongside his wife, attempted to trademark the phrase "I did a thing", a catchphrase that Clarkson often uses on his show Clarkson's Farm. Clarkson intended to use this trademark to sell merchandise containing the phrase such as hats and cups. Concerned that this would affect the I Did a Thing YouTube channel, Apollonov threatened legal action against Clarkson for the attempt to trademark his channel's name. Using the I Did a Thing twitter account, Apollonov told Clarkson to "GET FUCKED", and threatened Clarkson with legal action:"My Cousin's girlfriend's Sister is a lawyer and she is pretty good. You better watch out."Jeremy Clarkson responded to Apollonov by claiming that he was not aware of the attempt to trademark the phrase "I did a thing". Apollonov then jokingly threatened to trademark the phrase "Jeremy Clarkson" in Australia and put Clarkson's face on merchandise. Apollonov then went onto a podcast published on the comedy/satire website for The Chaser to jokingly say that he would use his home-made DIY laser guided dart firing drone to fire at one of Clarkson's very fast cars.

Creator Clash boxing tournament (2022) 

After the match, Apollonov said of Rallison:"To get in the ring with someone and actually have them hit you in the face and have you hit them in the face is a terrifying thing to do," "He fought well, and good work for having the balls to get in the ring with me."He revealed in a later video that he had built a vibrating cheating device to put in the pants of a chess player (originally intended for Aleksa Vulovic, then later used by Myth) as a parody of the Carlsen–Niemann controversy (This was used in Ludwig Ahgren's Mogul Chess-boxing event).

Boxing record

References 

Australian YouTubers
Australian comedians
Living people
1990 births
YouTube boxers